Ballard Memorial High School is a high school located in LaCenter, Kentucky, United States, although its mailing address is in Barlow.  The school serves grades 9 through 12.

References

Education in Ballard County, Kentucky
Ballard Memorial
Buildings and structures in Ballard County, Kentucky